Ambre may refer to:

People
 Ambre Allinckx (born 2002), Swiss squash player
 Ambre Ballenghien (born 2000), Belgian field hockey player
 Ambre Hammond Hammond (born in Cairns), Australian classical pianist
 Ambre McLean, Canadian singer-songwriter
 Ambré, American singer and songwriter
 Samuel Ambre (born 1972), Ghanaian politician
 Émilie Ambre (1849–1898), French opera singer

Other
 Ambre or Arrufiac, French wine grape variety
 Ambre Energy Energy Limited, Australian coal and oil shale company